KZNS (1280 kHz, The KSL Sports Zone) is a commercial AM radio station in Salt Lake City, Utah.  It airs a sports radio format and is owned by Jazz Communications LLC.
Programming is simulcast on co-owned KZNS-FM 97.5, licensed to Coalville, Utah. On weekdays, KZNS-AM-FM have local hosts discussing Salt Lake City and national sports.  Nights and weekends, programming is supplied by Fox Sports Radio.  KZNS-AM-FM are the flagship radio stations for the Utah Jazz basketball team and the Salt Lake Bees Minor League Baseball team.

KZNS's transmitter is near the Jordan River in North Salt Lake, and their headquarters are located inside the Vivint Arena in Salt Lake City.  It is a Class B radio station, running 50,000 watts by day, the maximum power for commercial AM radio stations in the U.S.  But at night, to protect other stations on 1280 AM, it drops power to just 670 watts.  It uses a directional antenna at all times.

History

KNAK
The station first signed on the air in February, 1945, and held the call sign KNAK.  The station was owned by the Granite District Radio Broadcasting Company with studios in the Continental Bank Building on South Temple at Main Street.

KNAK first broadcast on 1400 kHz at only 250 watts.  By this time, KSL was powered at 50,000 watts.  KNAK was not associated with any of the big radio networks.  Salt Lake City had four other radio stations, network affiliates of CBS, NBC, ABC and the Mutual Broadcasting System.  In the 1950s, KNAK moved to 1280 kHz, accompanied by an increase in power to 5,000 watts by day, 500 watts at night.

KWMS
On January 16, 1976, the station's call sign was changed to KWMS. As KWMS, the station aired an all-news format.  It was an affiliate of NBC Radio's "News and Information Service" (NIS), a 24 hour all-news network.

NIS was discontinued in 1977.  KWMS began doing a local version of the all-news format using its own anchors and the services of the Mutual Broadcasting System.

KDYL
On July 21, 1982, the station's call letters switched to KDYL. In the early and mid 1980s, KDYL aired an all-news format. By 1986, the station had begun airing the "Music of Your Life" adult standards format, featuring big band music and adult pop songs from the 1940s, 50s and 60s. The station continued airing this format until June 27, 2000.

On June 27, 2000, the station switched to a talk radio format.  It primarily carried conservative talk programming. Syndicated shows hosted by Michael Savage and Michael Medved appeared, along with "Imus in the Morning" hosted by Don Imus.

KZNS

In 2001, the station was acquired by the Simmons Media Group, which also owned popular adult contemporary station 100.3 KSFI.  On November 12, 2001, KDYL's call sign was changed to KZNS. That same day, Simmons Media changed the format of the station, airing CNN Headline News in the daytime and sports talk in the afternoon and evening. Soon thereafter, sports talk programming occupied the station's entire schedule, calling itself "The Zone."
When Simmons acquired the station, the KDYL call letters were assigned to a Tooele, Utah, station, then at 990 kHz, and the owner of that station, then Thomas Mathis, was compensated to release the KDYL call letters, changing the call sign of his station to KTLE. Prior to the Tooele station having the call sign of KDYL, those call letters were assigned to the 1320 kHz Salt Lake City station, now known as KNIT. Simmons wanted to call this station KDYL because those call letters had been in use for a long time in the Salt Lake City radio market.

As of February 1, 2011, KZNS' "The Zone" sports talk programming also began to be heard on co-owned KZNS-FM 97.5 licensed to Coalville, Utah, a Salt Lake City suburb.  Some time later, the Federal Communications Commission (FCC) allowed KZNS to increase its power to 50,000 watts by day and 670 watts at night.

As part of the change in ownership of the Utah Jazz, the sale of the station from the Larry H. Miller Group of Companies to Smith Entertainment Group was finalized on May 27, 2021.

On September 30, 2021, it was announced that Bonneville International, owner of the KSL AM and FM stations, would be taking over operations of The Zone sports network. The arrangement with Bonneville will result in select Utah Jazz games being aired on KSL. Founding host Gordon Monson and some producers were laid off by the new management. The Zone introduced a new lineup effective October 20.

References

External links

FCC History Cards for KZNS

Sports radio stations in the United States
ZNS
Mass media in Salt Lake City